The following is a list of bugs of the family Scutelleridae of Nepal. Seventeen different species are listed.

This list is primarily based on V.K. Thapa's 2000 "An Inventory of Nepal's Insects" and Samudra Lal Joshi's 2001 "Reference Insects of Nepal" with some recent additions and a modernized classification. 

Calliphara excellens - excellent jewel bug
Cantao ocellatus
Chrysocoris patricius
Chrysocoris pulchellus 
Chrysocoris stolli
Eucorysses grandis
Lamprocoris roylii 
Poecilocoris childreni
Poecilocoris crowleyi
Poecilocoris hardwickii
Poecilocoris druraei syn. Poecilocoris heissi 
Poecilocoris interruptus
Poecilocoris nepalensis - Nepalese jewel bug
Poecilocoris orientalis 
Poecilocoris ornatus
Poecilocoris pseudolatus
Poecilocoris purpurascens
Solenostethium rubropunctatum

See also
List of butterflies of Nepal
Odonata of Nepal
Cerambycidae of Nepal
Wildlife of Nepal

References

Scutelleridae
Insects of Nepal
Nepal